Maurice Busby (March 31, 1892 – November 3, 1945) was an American baseball pitcher in the Negro leagues. He played with the Bacharach Giants, All Cubans, and Baltimore Black Sox in 1921 and 1922. His brother Jim Busby played with the Indianapolis ABCs/Detroit Stars in 1933.

References

External links
  and Seamheads

Baltimore Black Sox players
Bacharach Giants players
All Cubans players
1892 births
1945 deaths
Baseball players from Michigan
Baseball pitchers
People from Benton Harbor, Michigan
20th-century African-American sportspeople